Jacques Mahéas (10 July 1939 – 20 August 2022) was a French politician who was a member of the Senate, representing the Seine-Saint-Denis department. He was a member of the Socialist Party.

In 2010, Mahéas was found guilty of sexually harassing a female employee nearly six years earlier. He was fined, but kept his seat in the Senate.

Mahéas died on 20 August 2022 at the age of 83.

References

1939 births
2022 deaths
French Senators of the Fifth Republic
Deputies of the 7th National Assembly of the French Fifth Republic
Deputies of the 8th National Assembly of the French Fifth Republic
Deputies of the 9th National Assembly of the French Fifth Republic
Senators of Seine-Saint-Denis
Politicians from Paris
Socialist Party (France) politicians
Mayors of places in Île-de-France
Members of Parliament for Seine-Saint-Denis